Tazehabad (also Romanized as Tāzehābād; also known as Tāzehābād-e Lātleyl) is a village in Lat Leyl Rural District, Otaqvar District, Langarud County, Gilan Province, Iran. At the 2006 census, its population was 119, in 30 families.

References 

Populated places in Langarud County